Julia Doyle may refer to:

Julia Doyle (musician) in Lydia D'Ustebyn Ladies Swing Band
Julia Doyle, character in Revolution (TV series)